Parliamentary elections were held in Czechoslovakia on 19 May 1935. The result was a victory for the newly established Sudeten German Party, which won 44 seats in the Chamber and 23 in the Senate. Funded by the German Nazi Party, it won over two-thirds of the vote amongst Sudeten Germans. Voter turnout was 91.9% in the Chamber election and 81.2% for the Senate. These elections would be the last in Czechoslovakia until 1946.

Results

Chamber of Deputies

Senate

References

Czechoslovakia
Parliamentary
Legislative elections in Czechoslovakia
Czechoslovakia